Giuseppe Pancera (10 January 1901, in Sona – 19 April 1977, in Castelnuovo del Garda) was an Italian professional road bicycle racer. He won second place in both the 1928 Giro d'Italia and the 1929 Tour de France.

Palmarès 

1926
Coppa Bernocchi
Coppa d'Inverno
Criterium d'apertura
1927
Coppa Bernocchi
Roma-Napoli-Roma
Giro d'Italia:
5th place overall classification
1928
Giro d'Italia:
2nd place overall classification
1929
Tour de France:
2nd place overall classification

External links 

Official Tour de France results for Giuseppe Pancera

Italian male cyclists
1901 births
1977 deaths
Cyclists from the Province of Verona